René of Alençon (1454 – 1 November 1492) was a French nobleman. He succeeded his father John II of Alençon as Duke of Alençon.

Life
René was born in 1454 to the House of Valois-Alençon. He was the son of John II of Alençon and Marie of Armagnac.

In 1478, he was restored as Duke of Alençon and Count of Perche, titles which had been confiscated from his family after his father's conviction in 1474.

Family
His first wife was Marguerite, daughter of William of Harcourt, Count of Tancarville. He married a second time on 14 May 1488 at Toul, to Margaret of Lorraine (1463 – 1 November 1521), daughter of Frederick, Count of Vaudémont and Yolande of Anjou. Margaret bore him three children:

 Charles IV of Alençon (1489–1525)
 Françoise of Alençon (c. 1490 – 14 September 1550, La Fleche), Duchess of Beaumont, married 1505 in Blois, François, Duke of Longueville (d. 1512), married 1513 Charles, Duke of Vendôme
 Anne (30 October 1492 – 18 October 1562, Casale Monferrato), Lady of la Guerche, married 31 August 1508 in Blois William IX Paleologos, Marquess of Montferrat

He also had several illegitimate children:

 Charles (d. 1545), Lord of Cany
 Marguerite, married 1485 Jacques de Boisguyon, married Henri de Bournel
 Jacqueline, married Gilles des Ormes

Ancestry

References

Sources

1454 births
1492 deaths
House of Valois-Alençon
103
Counts of Perche
15th-century peers of France